THY or Thy may refer to:

 Thy, the genitive case of the English personal pronoun thou (archaic)
 Thy (district), Jutland, Denmark
 Thymine, one of the four nucleobases in the nucleic acid of DNA
 Turkish Airlines (ICAO: THY, from Turkish )
 The first month in the Egyptian Middle Kingdom lunar calendar
 Lennart Thy (born 1992), German footballer

See also
 Thy1 (disambiguation)